Ståle is a given name. Notable people with the name include:

Ståle Dyrvik (born 1943), Norwegian historian
Ståle Eskeland (born 1943), Norwegian jurist
Ståle Kleiberg (born 1958), Norwegian composer and musicologist
Ståle Kyllingstad (1903–1987), Norwegian sculptor and designer
Ståle Petter Lyngstadaas, Norwegian researcher
Ståle Økland (born 1976), Norwegian writer, trend expert and public speaker
Ståle Steen Sæthre (born 1993), Norwegian footballer
Ståle Sandbech (born 1993), Norwegian snowboarder
Ståle Søbye (born 1971), Norwegian footballer who was a two time first team All American
Ståle Solbakken (born 1968), Norwegian footballer and coach
Ståle Stensaas (born 1971), Norwegian footballer and coach
Ståle Storli, the title of a Norwegian folksong and a novel by John Lie, published in 1880
Ståle Storløkken (born 1969), Norwegian jazz musician (keyboards, organ and piano) and composer

See also
Stale (disambiguation)

Norwegian masculine given names